Areklu (also Romanized as 'Areklū; also known as Arīglū and Arīklū) is a village in Hendudur Rural District, Sarband District, Shazand County, Markazi Province, Iran. At the 2006 census, its population was 107, in 29 families.

References 

Populated places in Shazand County